Asteropsis is a genus of echinoderms belonging to the family Asteropseidae.

The species of this genus are found in Indian and Pacific Ocean.

Species:

Asteropsis carinifera 
Asteropsis lissoterga

References

Asteropseidae
Asteroidea genera